"Think different" is an advertising slogan used from 1997 to 2002 by Apple Computer, Inc., now named Apple Inc. The campaign was created by the Los Angeles office of advertising agency TBWA\Chiat\Day.
The slogan has been widely taken as a response to the IBM slogan "Think". It was used in a television advertisement, several print advertisements, and several TV promos for Apple products.

As of 2020, "Think different" was still printed on the back of the box of the iMac, and possibly elsewhere.

Development
In 1984, Apple's "1984" Super Bowl advertisement was created by advertising agency Chiat\Day. In 1986, CEO John Sculley replaced Chiat\Day with BBDO. In 1997, under CEO Gil Amelio, BBDO pitched to an internal marketing meeting at the then struggling Apple, a new brand campaign with the slogan "We're back." Reportedly everyone in the meeting expressed approval with the exception of the recently returned Jobs who said "the slogan was stupid because Apple wasn't [yet] back."

Jobs then invited three advertising agencies to present new ideas that reflected the philosophy he thought had to be reinforced within the company he had co-founded. Chiat\Day was one of them.

The script was written by Rob Siltanen with participation of Lee Clow and many others on his creative team. The slogan "Think different" was created by Craig Tanimoto, an art director at Chiat\Day, who also contributed to the initial concept work. The look and feel of the print, outdoor and the photography used was researched, curated, and visually developed by art & design director Jessica (Schulman) Edelstein who, together with Lee Clow, met weekly with Steve Jobs and the team at Apple to hone the campaign in its many forms. Susan Alinsangan and Margaret (Midgett) Keene were also instrumental in developing the campaign further as it progressed and spread throughout the world. Great contributions were made by professionals in all agency departments from account services, to art buying, to production, to contract negotiators and media buyers who secured key placements. The commercial's music was composed by Chip Jenkins for Elias Arts.

The full text of the various versions of this script were co-written by creative director Rob Siltanen and creative director Ken Segall, along with input from many on the team at the agency and at Apple. While Jobs thought the creative concept "brilliant", he originally hated the words of the television commercial, but then changed his mind. According to Rob Siltanen:

Craig Tanimoto is also credited with opting for "Think different" rather than "Think differently," which was considered but rejected by Lee Clow. Jobs insisted that he wanted "different" to be used as a noun, as in "think victory" or "think beauty". He specifically said that "think differently" wouldn't have the same meaning to him. He wanted to make it sound colloquial, like the phrase "think big".

Jobs was crucial to the selection of the historical subjects pictured in the campaign, many of whom had never been featured in advertising, or never would have done so with any other company. He enabled the selection and the speed of negotiation with them or their surviving estates. Some of the particular iconic subjects were chosen because of his personal relationships, calling the families of Jim Henson and John F. Kennedy and flying to New York City to visit Yoko Ono. For the television narration, he called Robin Williams who was well known to be against appearing in advertising and whose wife refused to forward the call anyway, and Tom Hanks was then considered, but Richard Dreyfuss was an Apple fan.

Two versions of the narration in the television ad were created in the development process: one narrated by Jobs and one by Dreyfuss. Lee Clow argued that it would be "really powerful" for Jobs to narrate the piece, as a symbol of his return to the company and of reclaiming the Apple brand. On the morning of the first air date, Jobs decided to go with the Dreyfuss version, stating that it was about Apple, not about himself.

It was edited at Venice Beach Editorial, by Dan Bootzin, Chiat\Day's in-house editor, and post-produced by Hunter Conner.

Jobs said the following in a 1994 interview with the Santa Clara Valley Historical Association:

The Steve Jobs version of the ad was played at Apple's in-house memorial for him in 2011.

Formats

Television 
Significantly shortened versions of the advertisement script were used in two television advertisements, known as "Crazy Ones", directed by Chiat\Day's Jennifer Golub who also shared the art director credit with Jessica Schulman Edelstein and Yvonne Smith.

The one-minute ad featured black-and-white footage of 17 iconic 20th-century personalities, in this order of appearance: Albert Einstein, Bob Dylan, Martin Luther King Jr., Richard Branson, John Lennon (with Yoko Ono), Buckminster Fuller, Thomas Edison, Muhammad Ali, Ted Turner, Maria Callas, Mahatma Gandhi, Amelia Earhart, Alfred Hitchcock, Martha Graham, Jim Henson (with Kermit the Frog), Frank Lloyd Wright, and Pablo Picasso. The advertisement ends with an image of a young girl opening her closed eyes, as if making a wish. The final clip is taken from the All Around The World version of the "Sweet Lullaby" music video, directed by Tarsem Singh; the young girl is  Shaan Sahota, Singh's niece.

The thirty-second advertisement was a shorter version of the previous one, using 11 of the 17 personalities, but closed with Jerry Seinfeld, instead of the young girl. In order of appearance: Albert Einstein, Bob Dylan, Martin Luther King Jr., John Lennon, Martha Graham, Muhammad Ali, Alfred Hitchcock, Mahatma Gandhi, Jim Henson, Maria Callas, Pablo Picasso, and Jerry Seinfeld.  This version aired only once, during the series finale of Seinfeld.

Another early example of the "Think different" ads is on February 4, 1998, months before switching the colored apple logo to solid white, where an ad aired with a snail carrying an Intel Pentium II chip on its back moving slowly, as the Power Macintosh G3 claims that it is twice as fast as Intel's Pentium II Processor.

Print 
Print advertisements from the campaign were published in many mainstream magazines such as Newsweek and Time.  Their style was predominantly traditional, prominently featuring the company's computers or consumer electronics along with the slogan.

There was also another series of print ads which were more focused on brand image than specific products. Those featured a portrait of one historic figure, with a small Apple logo and the words "Think different" in one corner, with no reference to the company's products.  Creative geniuses whose thinking and work actively changed their respective fields where honored and included: Jimi Hendrix, Richard Clayderman, Miles Davis, Billy Graham, Bryan Adams, Cesar Chavez, John Lennon, Laurence Gartel, Mahatma Gandhi, Eleanor Roosevelt  and others.

Posters 
Promotional posters from the campaign were produced in small numbers in 24-by-36-inch sizes.  They feature the portrait of one historical figure, with a small Apple logo and the words "Think different" in one corner. The original long version of the ad script appears on some of them. The posters were produced between 1997 and 1998.

There were at least 29 "Think different" posters created. The sets were as follows:

Set 1
 Amelia Earhart
 Alfred Hitchcock
 Pablo Picasso
 Mahatma Gandhi
 Thomas Edison

Set 2
 Maria Callas
 Martha Graham
 Joan Baez
 Ted Turner
 14th Dalai Lama (never officially released due to licensing issues and the politically sensitive nature)

Set 3
 Jimi Hendrix
 Miles Davis
 Ansel Adams
 Lucille Ball and Desi Arnaz
 Bob Dylan (Never officially released due to licensing issues)
 Paul Rand

Set 4
 Frank Sinatra
 Richard Feynman
 Jackie Robinson
 Cesar Chavez

Set 5 (The Directors set, never officially released)
 Charlie Chaplin
 Francis Ford Coppola
 Orson Welles
 Frank Capra
 John Huston

In addition, around the year 2000, Apple produced the ten, 11x17 poster set often referred to as The Educators Set, which was distributed through their Education Channels. Apple sent out boxes (the cover of which is a copy of the "Crazy Ones" original TD poster) that each contained 3 packs (sealed in plastic) of 10 small or miniature "Think different" posters.

Educator Set
 Albert Einstein
 Amelia Earhart
 Miles Davis
 Jim Henson
 Jane Goodall
 Mahatma Gandhi
 John Lennon and Yoko Ono
 Cesar Chavez
 James Watson
 Pablo Picasso

During a special event held on October 14, 1998, at the Flint Center in Cupertino California, a limited edition 11" x 14" softbound book was given to employees and affiliates of Apple Computer, Inc. to commemorate the first year of the ad campaign.  The 50 page book contained a foreword by Steve Jobs, the text of the original "Think different" ad, and illustrations of many of the posters used in the campaign along with narratives describing each person.

Outdoor advertisement at MacWorld 2000 Tokyo, etc.

 Akira Kurosawa
 Issei Miyake
 Osamu Tezuka
 Akio Morita

Reception and influence 
Upon release, the "Think different" Campaign proved to be an enormous success for Apple and TBWA\Chiat\Day. Critically acclaimed, the spot would garner numerous awards and accolades, including the 1998 Emmy Award for Best Commercial and the 2000 Grand Effie Award for most effective campaign in America.

In retrospect, the new ad campaign marked the beginning of Apple's re-emergence as a marketing powerhouse. In the years leading up to the ad Apple had lost market share to the Wintel ecosystem which offered lower prices, more software choices, and higher-performance CPUs.  Worse for Apple's reputation was the high-profile failure of the Apple Newton, a billion-dollar project that proved to be a technical and commercial dud. The success of the "Think different" campaign, along with the return of Steve Jobs, bolstered the Apple brand and reestablished the "counter-culture" aura of its earlier days, setting the stage for the immensely successful iMac all-in-one personal computer and later the Mac OS X (now named macOS) operating system.

Revivals

Product packaging 
Since late 2009, the box packaging specification sheet for iMac computers has included the following footnote:

Macintosh     Think different.

In previous Macintosh packaging, Apple's website URL was printed below the specifications list.

The apparent explanation for this inconspicuous usage is that Apple wished to maintain its trademark registrations on both terms – in most jurisdictions, a company must show continued use of a trademark on its products in order to maintain registration, but neither trademark is widely used in the company's current marketing. This packaging was used as the required specimen of use when Apple filed to re-register "Think different" as a U.S. trademark in 2009.

macOS 
Apple has continued to include portions of the "Crazy Ones" text as Easter eggs in a range of places in macOS. This includes the high-resolution icon for TextEdit introduced in Leopard, the "All My Files" Finder icon introduced in Lion, the high-resolution icon for Notes in Mountain Lion and Mavericks and on the new Color LCD Display preferences menu introduced for MacBook Pro with Retina Display.

Apple Color Emoji
Several emoji glyphs in Apple's Apple Color Emoji font contain portions of the text of "Crazy Ones”, including 1F4CB ‘Clipboard’, 1F4C3 ‘Page with Curl’, 1F4C4 ‘Page facing up’, 1F4D1 ‘Bookmark Tabs’ and 1FA99 ‘Coin’.

Other media 
A portion of the text is recited in the trailer for Jobs, a biographical drama film of Steve Jobs' life. Ashton Kutcher, as Jobs, is shown recording the audio for the trailer in the film's final scene.

The Richard Dreyfuss audio version is used in the introduction of the first episode of The Crazy Ones, a podcast provided by Ricochet, hosted by Owen Brennan and Patrick Jones.

Parodies 
The Simpsons episode "Mypods and Boomsticks" pokes fun at the slogan, writing it "Think differently", a grammatically standard exclamation (which the slogan is not unless used as noun for the act of thinking).

For Steam's release on Mac OS X, Valve has released a Left 4 Dead–themed advertisement featuring Francis, whose in-game spoken lines involve him hating various things. The given slogan is "I hate different." Subsequently, for Team Fortress 2s release on Mac, a trailer was released which concludes with "Think bullets".

Aiura parodies this through the use of "Think Crabbing" in its opening.

In the musical Nerds, which depicts a fictionalized account of the lives of Steve Jobs and Bill Gates, there is a song titled "Think Different" in which Jobs hallucinates an anthropomorphized  Oracle dancing with him and urging him to fight back against the Microsoft empire.

In the animated show Gravity Falls episode "A Tale of Two Stans", a poster with the words "Ponder Alternatively" and a strawberry colored in a similar fashion as the old Apple logo shows in the background.

In the movie Monsters, Inc., an easter egg magazine at the end of the film references the slogan with a computer captioned, "Scare Different."

During Super Bowl LVI, Cutwater Spirits ran its first Super Bowl ad, "Here's To The Lazy Ones," which leaned into the laziness implicit in consuming its canned cocktails by depicting similarly lazy moves such as using a massage gun to tenderize meat.

See also 
 1984 Super Bowl ad
 AppleMasters
 The organization of the artist

References

External links 
 Steve Jobs narrated version (video)

American advertising slogans
1997 neologisms
Apple Inc. advertising
American television commercials
Advertising campaigns
1990s television commercials